Jamie Munro is a retired Venezuelan-American soccer player.  He played professionally in the USL A-League.

Born in Venezuela, Munro grew up in California.  He attended the University of San Diego where he played on the men's soccer team from 1994 to 1997.  He graduated with a bachelor's degree in finance.  In 1998, the San Diego Flash selected Munro in the Territorial Round of the USL A-League draft. In 2001, he retired and became a mortgage banker.

References

Living people
1976 births
American soccer players
San Diego Flash players
San Diego Toreros men's soccer players
A-League (1995–2004) players
Association football defenders